John Andrew Turner (born 10 April 2001) is a South African cricketer. Turner attended Hilton College, where he was head boy in 2019, and former Hampshire coach Dale Benkenstein was head coach. In April 2020, he was part of Gauteng's Academy intake. The following month, he was due to play in the Southern Premier Cricket League in England, but he did not travel due to the COVID-19 pandemic. He made his List A debut on 22 July 2021, for Hampshire in the 2021 Royal London One-Day Cup in England. His first professional dismissal was the wicket of Alastair Cook. He made his first-class debut on 13 May 2022, for Hampshire against the Sri Lanka Cricket Development XI side during their tour of England, taking 5/31 in the first innings.

References

External links
 

2001 births
Living people
South African cricketers
Hampshire cricketers
Cricketers from Johannesburg
Alumni of Hilton College (South Africa)
South African expatriate sportspeople in England